Gordon Snow may refer to:
 Gordon E. Snow (born 1946), Utah politician
 Gordon M. Snow, FBI executive